The 1917 Wisconsin Badgers football team represented the University of Wisconsin as a member of the Big Ten Conference during the 1917 college football season. Led by John R. Richards, who returned for his second season as head coach after helming the team in 1911, the Badgers compiled an overall record of 4–2–1 with a mark of 3–2 in conference play, tying for third place in the Western Conference. The team's captain was Howard Hancock.

Schedule

References

Wisconsin
Wisconsin Badgers football seasons
Wisconsin Badgers football